The Conspiracy is a 1914 American drama silent film directed by Allan Dwan and adapted from the Robert M. Baker and John Emerson play of the same name. The film stars John Emerson, Lois Meredith, Harold Lockwood, Iva Shepard, Francis Byrne and Hal Clarendon. The film was released on December 10, 1914, by Paramount Pictures.

Plot
Winthrop Clavering a mystery writer, is continually ridiculed for the fiction of the crimes he depicts, so he decides to solve a case himself. To that end, he determines to find the slayer of Pedro Alvarez, who whispered before dying that his assailant was a woman. At the City Refuge for Homeless Girls, Clavering obtains the assistance of Margaret Holt, the sister of Victor Holt, the district attorney. Margaret, it is revealed, was abducted by Juanita, a member of a gang of white slavers led by Alvarez. After escaping from a brothel, Margaret became Alvarez' stenographer, hoping to gather secret information on his gang. While searching for evidence, Margaret was surprised by Alvarez, whom she killed. Finally, Clavering captures the gang, clears Margaret, and encourages her romance with cub reporter Jack Howell.

Cast   
John Emerson as Winthrop Clavering
Lois Meredith as Margaret Holt
Harold Lockwood as Jack Howell
Iva Shepard as Juanita
Francis Byrne as Victor Holt
Hal Clarendon as Morton
Dodson Mitchell as Bill Flynn
Edouard Durand as Savelli

References

External links 
 

1914 films
1910s English-language films
Silent American drama films
1914 drama films
Paramount Pictures films
Films directed by Allan Dwan
American black-and-white films
American silent feature films
1910s American films